Foumbolo is a town in northeast Ivory Coast. It is a sub-prefecture and commune of Dabakala Department in Hambol Region, Vallée du Bandama District.

In 2014, the population of the sub-prefecture of Foumbolo was 18,808 18,808.

Villages
The 23 villages of the sub-prefecture of Foumbolo and their population in 2014 are:

Notes

Sub-prefectures of Hambol
Communes of Hambol